Ataur Rahman Khan Angur is a Bangladesh Nationalist Party politician and the former Member of Parliament of Narayanganj-2.

Career
Angur was elected to parliament from Narayanganj-2 as a Bangladesh Nationalist Party candidate in 2001.

References

Living people
People from Narayanganj District
Bangladeshi businesspeople
Bangladesh Nationalist Party politicians
5th Jatiya Sangsad members
6th Jatiya Sangsad members
8th Jatiya Sangsad members
Year of birth missing (living people)
20th-century Bengalis
21st-century Bengalis